was a renowned Japanese photographer.

References

Japanese photographers
1924 births
1964 deaths
People from Aomori (city)